Guido Ezequiel Abayián (born 24 June 1989 in Neuquén) is an Argentine footballer who plays as a forward for FBC Gravina in Italian Serie D.

Career
Abayián joined Italian club Calcio Cittanovese in September 2018. In the summer 2019, he joined another Italian club, U.S. Savoia 1908 in the Serie D. He left the club in December 2019.

In July 2020, Abayián then signed with Serie D club Città di Sant'Agata. On 9 December 2020, he moved on to Taranto. On 4 March 2021, Abayián joined FBC Gravina.

References

External links
 
 Profile at BDFA 
 

1989 births
Living people
People from Neuquén
Argentine sportspeople of Armenian descent
Association football forwards
Argentine expatriate footballers
Argentine footballers
Club de Gimnasia y Esgrima La Plata footballers
Unión de Sunchales footballers
San Luis de Quillota footballers
Cerro Largo F.C. players
C.A. Bella Vista players
Club Atlético Huracán footballers
Atenas de San Carlos players
Club Cipolletti footballers
Atlético Clube de Portugal players
Lincoln Red Imps F.C. players
SFC Etar Veliko Tarnovo players
Taranto F.C. 1927 players
Primera B de Chile players
Torneo Federal A players
Uruguayan Segunda División players
Serie D players
Expatriate footballers in Bulgaria
Expatriate footballers in Portugal
Expatriate footballers in Chile
Expatriate footballers in Gibraltar
Expatriate footballers in Uruguay
Expatriate footballers in Italy
Argentine expatriate sportspeople in Bulgaria
Argentine expatriate sportspeople in Portugal
Argentine expatriate sportspeople in Chile
Argentine expatriate sportspeople in Gibraltar
Argentine expatriate sportspeople in Uruguay
Argentine expatriate sportspeople in Italy